Zagheh (also Romanized as Zāgheh) is a city in and capital of Zagheh District, in Khorramabad County, Lorestan Province, Iran. At the 2006 census, its population was 2,839, in 618 families.

References

Towns and villages in Khorramabad County
Cities in Lorestan Province